Pseudogoodyera is a genus of flowering plants from the orchid family, Orchidaceae. It contains one known species, Pseudogoodyera wrightii, native to San Luis Potosí, Cuba, Guatemala and Belize.

See also
 List of Orchidaceae genera

References

External links

Monotypic Orchidoideae genera
Cranichideae genera
Orchids of Mexico
Orchids of Central America
Orchids of Belize
Orchids of Guatemala
Flora of Cuba
Flora of San Luis Potosí
Spiranthinae